The Worcester State Lancers football team represents Worcester State University in college football at the NCAA Division III level. The Lancers are members of the Massachusetts State Collegiate Athletic Conference (MASCAC), fielding its team in the MASCAC since 2013. The Lancers play their home games at John F. Coughlin Field in Worcester, Massachusetts. 

Their head coach is Adam Peloquin, who took over the position for the 2020 season.

Conference affiliations
 Club team (1983–1984)
 Independant (1985)
 New England Football Conference (1986–2012)
 Massachusetts State Collegiate Athletic Conference (2013–present)

List of head coaches

Key

Coaches

Year-by-year results

Notes

References

External links
 

 
American football teams established in 1985
1985 establishments in Massachusetts